Golmaal Again is a 2017 Indian Hindi-language supernatural comedy film written and directed by Rohit Shetty; produced by Rohit Shetty Pictures, Mangal Murti Films and Reliance Entertainment. The film is the fourth installment of Golmaal franchise and stars Ajay Devgn, Arshad Warsi, Parineeti Chopra, Tabu, Tusshar Kapoor, Shreyas Talpade, Kunal Khemu, Neil Nitin Mukesh and Johnny Lever. 

The film was released in Diwali 2017. Despite clashing with Aamir Khan's Secret Superstar, Golmaal Again became one of the year's highest grossers, was a blockbuster at the box office and became the 46th highest grossing Indian film of all time. Its lifetime domestic net collection was more than 244 crores, while the worldwide gross ended at 311 crores. The film received mixed reviews from critics with praise for its humour and performances and criticism for its flaws in the technical aspects. A spin-off titled Cirkus was released on 23 December 2022.

Plot 

Gopal, Madhav, Lucky, Laxman and Laxman 2 are orphans in an orphanage in Ooty managed by businessman Joy Jamnadas. Gopal is afraid of ghosts, Lucky is mute and Laxman has a speech impediment. The boys find a baby girl and take her in, naming her Khushi. They care for her and are also aware of librarian Anna's ability to see ghosts and spirits. One day, when Madhav pranks and scares the timid Gopal in an empty bungalow, a fight ensues between the boys. Gopal gets punished, which prompts Gopal and Laxman to leave the orphanage, and soon, Madhav, Lucky and Laxman also do the same. Khushi is later adopted by the loving Colonel Chauhan and his wife.

Some years later, Gopal and Laxman work for Babli Bhai and Madhav, Lucky and Laxman work for Vasooli Bhai. The group reunites after learning about Jamnadas' demise. Returning to the orphanage after 25 years, they meet Col. Chauhan, Anna and Pappi, another orphan from the orphanage who has frequent memory loss. They meet a girl who they think is the bungalow's caretaker, Damini and learn about Khushi's demise. At an event after Jamnadas' funeral, businessman Vasu Reddy reveals the orphanage would be demolished and moved elsewhere in plans to make his own building. When the group leaves the orphanage and returns, a ghost possesses Laxman and speak in Nana Patekar's voice which scares Gopal. Next, the ghost possesses Madhav and prompts Vasooli to give them a task, indirectly bringing the three back to Ooty. A scared Gopal calls Anna, who reveals that there is a spirit in their house and suggests him and Laxman to move to Col. Chauhan's house. Upon reaching Ooty, the two groups start fighting each other out of anger. The three try to scare Gopal into leaving the house, but Gopal gets possessed and beats Lucky and Laxman badly. Later, Vasu Reddy assigns Madhav, Lucky and Laxman to burn down the house. But things go awry when Lucky gets possessed by the spirit and starts talking, which scares the group. The two groups then decide to leave, but Anna and Damini convince them to stay for the birthday celebration, and the group makes amends. The four find that Gopal has fallen in love with Damini and force him to confess his feelings. Pappi arrives and is shown that he cannot see her, revealing that the girl they assumed to be Damini is actually someone else who is a ghost, while the real Damini is Pappi's girlfriend. The boys get terrified and try to escape the house along with Pappi, Babli Bhai and Vasooli Bhai after Damini confesses it herself. Anna arrives and stops them and explains to them that the ghost is none other than their childhood friend Khushi.

A flashback narrated by Khushi explains how her boyfriend, Nikhil Surana, a young businessman and Jamnadas' nephew, killed him in order to obtain the orphanage in his name and demolish it for the construction of a site. Upon confronting him and threatening to go to the police, Khushi was strangled to death by Nikhil. With the help of Vasu Reddy, he managed to prove the killings to be accidents. However, Khushi's spirit came for help to Anna, who was surprised that the boys could see Khushi and eventually brought them to the house to help get justice for Khushi.

Back to the present, Gopal thrashes the goons sent by Vasu Reddy while the rest of the boys, who wanted to stay away from the matter, get emotionally convinced to stay. They convince Gopal to stop chasing the goons and later almost manage to scare Vasu into confessing the truth, but Nikhil arrives before they can and reveals that there is no evidence to prove him guilty. This leads to a fight, during which Khushi attacks and nearly kills Nikhil but is calmed down by Anna, and Vasu convinces Nikhil to confess. With the orphanage saved, Khushi's spirit departs to heaven after bidding goodbye to the boys and Anna.

Cast
 Ajay Devgn as Gopal 
 Arshad Warsi as Madhav 
 Tabu as Anna Mathew / Narrator
 Diksha Sharma as Young Anna
 Parineeti Chopra as Khushi 
 Tusshar Kapoor as Lucky  
 Saud Mansuri as Young Lucky
 Shreyas Talpade as Laxman 1
 Kunal Khemu as Laxman 2
 Neil Nitin Mukesh as Nikhil 
 Johny Lever as Pappi
 Sanjay Mishra as Babli
 Mukesh Tiwari as Vasooli
 Prakash Raj as Vasu Reddy 
 Vrajesh Hirjee as Panduranga
 Murali Sharma as Inspector Dande
 Vijay Patkar as Havaldar
 Uday Tikekar as Joy Jamnadas
 Sachin Khedekar as Colonel Chauhan
 Ashwini Kalsekar as Damini 
 Mamta Verma as Colonel's wife
 Shreya Anchan as himself 
 Mohan Ram as Ram Iyer, ghost 
 Shriswara as Prerna Iyer
 Nana Patekar as voice of ghost,himself

Production

In July 2016, Rohit Shetty and Ajay Devgn announced the fourth installment of Golmaal series. For the female lead role, Shetty again wanted to cast Kareena Kapoor who played the heroine in Golmaal 2 & Golmaal 3. However, she stepped out owing to her pregnancy and Parineeti Chopra was signed. After Tabu's entry in the film, Neil Nitin Mukesh was confirmed for the antagonistic part. Prakash Raj joined the film in February 2017.

Principal photography commenced at Mumbai in March 2017. First schedule ended in April 2017. The film wrapped up in July 2017, and post-production work was finished in the last week of August 2017.

Reception

Critical response
Meena Iyer of The Times of India gave the film 3.5 stars and stated that the film is full of laughs with no substance. Raja Sen of NDTV gave the film 2 stars, stating that Golmaal Again is "a marginally better film than Golmaal 3 and Golmaal Returns" but felt the film was too long. Rajeev Masand of News 18 gave the film 2 out of 5 stars and said, "Mercifully no cars are spun around like tops and exploded this time around, but the characters repeatedly bandy about the film's message like a disclaimer, as if warning you not to expect any more than they promise to deliver: “No logic, only magic.” Logic indeed is in short supply here, and frankly, the real magic the filmmakers conjure up is the ability to keep this franchise on the road for all these years with such minimal creative investment."

Box office
On its opening day, Golmaal Again grossed 30.10 crore net, one of the highest openings for a Bollywood film in 2017. The film collected 28.25 on the second day. The third day's collection was 28.5 crore. On the fourth day, the film collected 15.25 crore, taking the total collections to 102.85 crore. On the fifth day, the film collected 13.25 crore. The sixth day's collection of the film was 10.5 crore.

By the end of the first week, the film grossed 135 crore. The third week's gross was 1974 million. Golmaal Again grossed 200 crore after four weeks of its release in Indian box office. The film grossed US$3 million in its first weekend in overseas. The film grossed $160,000 in Nepal, and $400,000 in Pakistan in the first weekend. The worldwide collection of the film was 3 billion in its fourth week. Also it is the highest-grossing Indian film in Fiji. The film became the highest-grossing Bollywood film of 2017 Until Tiger Zinda Hai broke its record in 2017. Golmaal Again ran in cinemas for more than 50 days in India.

Soundtrack

The music of the film have been composed by Amaal Mallik, S. Thaman, Lijo George-DJ Chetas and Abhishek Arora while the lyrics of the film have been penned by Kumaar. The first track of the film titled as "Golmaal (Title Track)" sung by Brijesh Shandilya and Aditi Singh Sharma was released on 23 September 2017. The second track of the film "Neend Churai Meri" from the 1997 film Ishq has been recreated to "Maine Tujhko Dekha" for this film in the voices of Neeraj Shridhar and Sukriti Kakar and was released on 29 September 2017. The soundtrack was released on 6 October 2017 by T-Series.

Release
20 October 2017 was announced as release date of the film, coinciding with Diwali.

See also

 List of Hindi comedy films
 List of Hindi horror films

References

External links
 
 

2010s buddy comedy films
2010s Hindi-language films
2017 films
2017 action comedy films
2010s fantasy comedy films
Indian comedy horror films
Films scored by Thaman S
Indian action comedy films
Indian fantasy action films
Films shot in Mumbai
Indian buddy films
Indian sequel films
Reliance Entertainment films
Films directed by Rohit Shetty
2017 comedy films
Films shot in Ooty